Coleophora kunenensis is a species of moth in the family Coleophoridae. It is found in Kenya, Namibia and South Africa (Mpumalanga, KwaZulu-Natal).

References 

 

kunenensis
Moths described in 2015
Moths of Africa